Inhalation is the drawing in of a substance from the external environment into the lungs

Inhale may also refer to:

 Inhale (film), a 2010 American film
 "Inhale" (song), by Stone Sour
 Inhale (album), an album by Marsheaux
 "Inhale", a song by Killswitch Engage from The End of Heartache